The following streetcar lines once operated in Manhattan, New York City, New York, United States.

List of lines

North-south lines
Lines related to Broadway are listed first, and then the table contains all other lines by their Lower Manhattan trunk (if applicable) from north to south.

East-west lines
Lines are listed roughly from east to west.

See also
 List of streetcar lines in the Bronx
 List of streetcar lines in Brooklyn
 List of streetcar lines in Queens
 List of streetcar lines in Staten Island
 List of town tramway systems in the United States

References
Chicago Transit & Railfan Web Site: New York City Transit

 
Man